Malaysia competed in the 1981 Southeast Asian Games held in Manila, Philippines from 6 to 15 December 1981.

Medal summary

Medals by sport

Medallists

Football

Men's tournament
Group A 

Semifinal

Gold medal match

References

1981
Nations at the 1981 Southeast Asian Games
1981 in Malaysian sport